Noradrenergic cell group A6sc is a group of cells fluorescent for norepinephrine that are scattered in the nucleus subceruleus of the macaque.,

References

External links 
 BrainInfo

Norepinephrine